FEMM may refer to:

FEMM (duo), a Japanese musical group
Forum Economic Ministers Meeting (FEMM) of the Pacific Islands Forum, initiated 1995
FEMM, European Parliament Committee on Women's Rights and Gender Equality